Kathryn Morrison may refer to:
Kathryn Morrison (model) (born 1955), American model
Kathryn Morrison (politician) (1942–2013), Wisconsin legislator
Kathryn A. Morrison (born 1959), British historian